This is a list of games and applications for the Nintendo DSi handheld game console previously available for download via the DSi Shop in the North America region. New DSiWare games were added every Thursday at 12:00 pm (noon) Eastern Time. As of March 31, 2017, DSiWare games are no longer purchasable on the Nintendo DSi due to the shutdown of the Nintendo DSi Shop. On March 27, 2023, DSiWare games will no longer be available in public circulation because of the closure of the eShop on the 3DS and Wii U, yet only previously owned purchases can be redownloaded. Prior to March 2023, some games, like Just SING! and Domo, were delisted from the eShop and some relating to browsers, like Nintendo Fan Network, became unreloadable after the closure of the DSi Shop in 2017.

List
There are currently 213 games set at 200 Nintendo Points, 2 set at 300 Nintendo Points, 249 set at 500 Nintendo Points, 104 set at 800 Nintendo Points, 3 set at 1,000 Nintendo Points, & 1 set at 1,200 Nintendo Points; as well as 29 Applications at various prices.

In the DSi shop, these are divided into 4 categories: Free, 200, 500, & 800+. Software is listed here with games sorted by category & title, followed by applications; but clicking the header of any column will re-sort by that attribute.

This list contains  games.

#DSiWare program cannot be transferred from the Nintendo DSi to the Nintendo 3DS console.

Notes
On , Nintendo released an update for Nintendo DSi Browser. The update includes improvements to the application and reduced the total blocks size needed to install. DSi owners may update their browser by redownloading the application from the DSi Shop.
On , (Black Friday), Nintendo released two Nintendo DSi bundles preloaded with free DSiWare games.
The first bundle was preloaded with: Brain Age Express: Arts & Letters, Brain Age Express: Sudoku, Brain Age Express: Math, Clubhouse Games Express: Card Classics and Photo Clock.
The second bundle was preloaded with: Mario vs. Donkey Kong: Minis March Again, WarioWare: Snapped!, Dr. Mario Express, Mario Calculator, and Mario Clock.
On , Nintendo released an update for Mario vs. Donkey Kong: Minis March Again, WarioWare: Snapped! and Dr. Mario Express. In an email respond from Nintendo Customer Support they mentioned that it is to upgrade the performance of the Nintendo DSi Shop, but it has no impact on game play or any game play options. DSi owners may update their games by redownloading the DSiWare game from the DSi Shop.
On , Nintendo released the Nintendo DSi XL preloaded with Brain Age Express: Math, Brain Age Express: Arts & Letters, Photo Clock, Flipnote Studio and Nintendo DSi Browser. At the same time, any new Nintendo DSi systems on and after that date will now preloaded with Flipnote Studio and Nintendo DSi Browser.
From May 10 to June 10, 2010, Photo Dojo could be downloaded for free. Since June 11, 2010, Photo Dojo has been downloadable for 200 Points.
Starting June 16, 2011, new games and applications are added to the DSi Shop and Nintendo eShop on Thursdays (previously on Mondays).
From September 28, 2011 to February 20, 2012, The Legend of Zelda: Four Swords was available on DSiWare as a free download. After this period, the game was delisted from the Nintendo eShop and DSi Shop.
On June 19, 2015, the title Brain Age Express: Sudoku was retired from both DSi Shop and Nintendo 3DS eShop. The reason is still unknown.
On September 30, 2016, the ability to add DSi Points for the purchase of new games on the DSi Shop was removed, followed by the closure of the DSi Shop on March 31, 2017. However, DSiWare games available on the Nintendo eShop have remained unaffected.

See also
List of DSiWare games and applications
List of DSiWare games (PAL region)
List of Nintendo DS games
Nintendo DSi System Software
List of WiiWare games
List of WiiWare games (North America)
List of Nintendo 3DS games
List of Wii U software

References

External links
Hudson Soft DSiWare game titles
4Pockets.com DSiWare game titles

DSiWare